Santangelo is an Italian surname and may refer to:

 Santangelo novels, a series of novels by Jackie Collins
 Santangelo family, a fictional family from the novels

People with the surname

Santangelo
 F. P. Santangelo (born 1967), American professional baseball player
 Mara Santangelo (born 1981), Italian professional tennis player
 George Santangelo, American genomicist
 Matt Santangelo (born 1977), American–Italian professional basketball player
 Alfred E. Santangelo (born 1912), American lawyer and politician
 Enrico Santangelo (born 1963), Italian author and art historian

Santángelo
 Duke of Santángelo, a hereditary title in the Peerage of Spain
 Jorge Cocco Santángelo (born 1936), Argentine painter and professor of art

See also
 Elektra v. Santangelo, a 2005 court case
 San Angelo, Texas
 Sant'Angelo (disambiguation)

Surnames of Italian origin
Surnames of Spanish origin